John Pennington may refer to:

John Pennington, 1st Baron Muncaster (c. 1740–1813), British peer and Tory politician
John L. Pennington (1829–1900), American newspaper publisher, politician, and the fifth Governor of Dakota Territory
John Penington, or Pennington, (c.1584–1646) English naval officer
John Pennington, 3rd Baronet, British Member of Parliament for Cumberland
John Kenneth Pennington (1927–2011), priest, lecturer of St Mary's Church, Nottingham and Sheriff of Nottingham 1982-1983
John Pennington (politician) (1870–1945), Australian politician